The PBS Short Film Festival, previously known as the PBS Online Film Festival, is an annual film festival focused on independent short films, hosted by American public broadcaster PBS. The festival began in 2012. In 2020, the name changed from the PBS Online Film Festival to the PBS Short Film Festival. In 2021, the festival replaced online voting and popularity awards with a jury prize, selected by a jury composed of filmmakers, producers and PBS executives.

The festival's films often cover social issues and are available to stream online via PBS’ website or its mobile video app, Passport, and additionally air on PBS’ member stations. The festival runs for two to six weeks and also hosts in-person screenings. As part of film selection, different member stations partner with PBS to find and submit films.

History 
The festival began in 2012, showcasing 20 films, which aired on the PBS website and YouTube channel. A “People’s Choice” prize was awarded based on votes from online viewers. The festival ran from March 1 to April 16 and was hosted by filmmakers Patrick Epino and Stephen Dypiangco of the National Film Society. In 2013, the festival expanded to highlight 25 films. Voting ran between March 4 and March 22.

The 2014 festival ran from June 16 to June 31 and similarly had 25 films, which were additionally streamed on Roku and Xbox, alongside the PBS website and YouTube. The 2015 film festival ran from June 15 to July 17 and was nominated for a Webby award. The 2015 festival garnered 350,000 streams and 50,000 votes. The 2016 festival ran from July 11 to July 29 and was the last to feature the “Most Watched” and “People’s Choice” awards. It also included 25 films.

In 2017, the festival introduced a Juried Prize, with a panel of eight jurors from PBS and the film industry selecting their favorite film. The “People’s Choice” award was renamed the “Most Popular” award, but was still chosen by online voters. The award was determined by adding all views, votes and Facebook and YouTube “shares” and “likes.” In 2017, films were additionally streamed on Apple TV, Amazon’s FireTV and the PBS app on Android and iOS.

In 2018, the festival, which ran July 16 to July 27, expanded streaming to include Facebook video. The 2019 festival ran July 15 to 26 and began with a screening event at the Howard Theater. The 2019 jury included Washington Post film critic Ann Hornaday. The festival included Balloon Girl, a film by children’s TV creator Shabnam Rezaei. The 2019 festival kept a Juried Prize and the Most Popular award.

In 2020, the festival changed its name from the PBS Online Film Festival to the PBS Short Film Festival. The 2020 competition kept both prizes from 2019 and ran July 13 to July 24.

In 2021, for the film festival’s tenth anniversary, films were additionally available to be viewed in VR, across VR platforms like Daydream, Oculus/Meta Quest and Playstation VR. That year, selected films were separated into six topical categories: culture, family, race, humanity, identity and society. The 2021 festival only offered a Juried Prize.

In 2022, the festival won a people’s choice Webby award for best festival or conference, as well as a People’s Choice Webby award. Those awards were among 10 won by PBS that year. The films were presented in five categories: family, identity, culture, humanity and race. The festival ran from July 11 to July 22. An inaugural screening was held at the National Harbor on July 15. Like the 2021 festival, the 2022 festival only offered a Juried Prize.

Awards 
From 2012 to 2016, the PBS Short Film Festival awarded a “People’s Choice” award, voted on by online viewers of the year's selected films. In 2013, the festival also awarded a “Most Watched” award, which gave a second prize to the film with the most views or streams. In 2017, the festival changed to a single “Most Popular” award, based on views. That same year, PBS introduced a Juried Prize. In 2021, PBS retired the Most Popular award.

As of 2022, the PBS Short Film Festival only offers a Juried Prize.

Mixed Award Table

References 

PBS original programming
Public broadcasting in the United States
Short film festivals in the United States